Blepephaeus fulvus is a species of beetle in the family Cerambycidae. It was described by Maurice Pic in 1933. It is known from Malaysia, China, Vietnam, and Thailand.

References

Blepephaeus
Beetles described in 1933